Aqcheli may refer to:
 Aqcheli-ye Olya
 Aqcheli-ye Qerkhlar